Argueil is a commune in the Seine-Maritime department in the Normandy region in northern France.

Geography
It is the smallest chef-lieu of any canton in the department.

Heraldry

Population

Places of interest

 The church of St.Maurice, dating from the sixteenth century.
 The manoir d'Argueil, dating from the sixteenth century
 Some old houses and the remains of a donjon in the park of the chateau.

See also
Communes of the Seine-Maritime department

References

Communes of Seine-Maritime